2091 Aluminium has Chromium, copper, iron, lithium, magnesium as minor alloying elements.

Chemical Composition

2091 Aluminium alloy properties

Aluminium alloy table

References 

Aluminium alloys
Aluminium–copper alloys